is a railway station in the city of Aisai, Aichi Prefecture, Japan, operated by Meitetsu.

Lines

Station layout
The station  has two elevated opposed side platforms, with the station building located underneath. The station is normally unattended.

Platforms

Adjacent stations

Station history
Fujinami Station was opened on January 23, 1914. The tracks were elevated in July 2002, and the new (and unattended) station building was completed at that time.

Passenger statistics
In fiscal 2017, the station was used by an average of 2,947 passengers daily (boarding passengers only).

Surrounding area
Saori Junior High School
Seirinkan High School

See also
 List of Railway Stations in Japan

References

External links

 Official web page 

Railway stations in Japan opened in 1914
Railway stations in Aichi Prefecture
Stations of Nagoya Railroad
Aisai, Aichi